"Hello" is a song by American pop recording duo Karmin. The song is the second official single from their debut EP of the same name, Hello.

Background
It was written by band members Amy Heidemann and Nick Noonan, along with production team Stargate, Autumn Rowe and collaborator Claude Kelly. The song began playing on mainstream radio stations July 31, 2012. Hello was the group's second song to top the Hot Dance Club Songs chart after Brokenhearted.

The "Hello, hello, hello" chorus interpolates the same lyrics from Nirvana's "Smells Like Teen Spirit"; the band is given writing credit on the track.

Music video
Karmin shot the music video for "Hello" in the China Town plaza in Los Angeles in June 2012. A forty-second teaser for the video was released on Karmin's official YouTube channel on August 4, 2012. The music video was released to MTV, VH1, and VEVO on August 7, 2012.

Live performances
The duo previewed the song in live acoustic settings on their promotional radio tours in early 2012, as well as recent events like LA Pride 2012, Kansas City Pride 2012, and the "R U on the List" Tour with tour mates Flo Rida, Cee-Lo Green, B.o.B and Kirko Bangz. They also performed the song on 2nd Indonesian Choice Awards.

Credits and Personnel
Vocals: Karmin
Songwriting: Mikkel S. Eriksen, Amy Heidemann, Tor Erik Hermansen, Claude Kelly, Nick Noonan, Autumn Rowe 
Production: Stargate
Credits adapted from Hello album liner notes.

Charts and certifications

Weekly charts

Year-end charts

Release history

See also
 List of number-one dance singles of 2012 (U.S.)

References

External links

2012 singles
Karmin songs
Song recordings produced by Stargate (record producers)
Songs written by Claude Kelly
Songs written by Autumn Rowe
Songs written by Mikkel Storleer Eriksen
Songs written by Tor Erik Hermansen
2012 songs
Epic Records singles